Mindful Chef is a British meal kit retailer, headquartered in Battersea, London, founded by three friends, Rob Grieg-Gran and Myles Hopper, Giles Humphries. Mindful Chef supplies subscribers with recipe kit boxes which include ready-measured, fresh ingredients and easily followed healthy recipes.

Set up in 2015 by three Devon school friends Giles, Myles and Rob, the brand's mission is to make healthy eating easy. Its recipe boxes and prepared food range provide people with everything needed to cook delicious nutritionally-balanced meals, delivering across the UK.

Mindful Chef aims to encourage individuals to lead a healthier life by reducing the amount of processed food consumed and cutting out refined carbohydrates. They are the official nutrition partner of the English Institute of Sport and the British Heart Foundation  to launch a new range of recipes that can help to support heart and circulatory health.

History 
November 2020, Nestlé acquire majority stake in the company.

In January 2019, Piper Invests £6m to support rapid growth in the UK market.

November 2018 Mindful Chef is certified as a B Corporation.

July 2016, Mindful Chef receives investment from Sir Andy Murray and Victoria Pendleton as part of a £1m crowdfunding campaign.

April 2015, the first recipe boxes were hand delivered by the founders.

References

External links
 

Online retailers of the United Kingdom
British companies established in 2015
Retail companies established in 2015
Internet properties established in 2015
Online grocers
Subscription services
Nestlé brands
B Lab-certified corporations